Sodium bromate, the inorganic compound with the chemical formula of NaBrO3, is the sodium salt of bromic acid. It is a strong oxidant.

Uses
Sodium bromate is mainly used in continuous or batch dyeing processes involving sulfur or vat dyes and as a hair-permagent, chemical agent, or gold solvent in gold mines when used with sodium bromide.

Production
Sodium bromate is produced by passing bromine into a solution of sodium carbonate.  It may also be produced by the electrolytic oxidation of sodium bromide. Alternatively, it can also be created by the oxidation of bromine with chlorine to sodium hydroxide at 80 °C.

3 Br2+3 Na2CO3 → 5 NaBr+NaBrO3+3 CO2

Human health issues 
Bromate in drinking water is undesirable because it is a suspected human carcinogen. Its presence in Coca-Cola's Dasani bottled water forced a recall of that product in the UK.

References

External links
Sodium Bromate MSDS On The Wayback Machine: December 6 2018

Sodium compounds
Bromates
Oxidizing agents